Igor Mislyumovich Nadzhiev (born November 13, 1967, Astrakhan) is a Soviet and Russian singer, songwriter, composer, poet and actor. Pesnya Goda  Award Winner (1997).

Biography
He was born in Astrakhan. From the age of four he began to study music. In 1983 he entered the conductor-choral department of the Astrakhan Musical College, bearing the name of Modest Mussorgsky.

Since 1986, he has been a pop singer, author of a number of solo programs, including, thanks to Boris Brunov, on the stage of the Moscow State Variety Theatre. The singer connects his formation as an artist with the poet Leonid Derbenyov and the composer Maksim Dunayevsky.

Discography
1994   Lost Country (CD)
1995    You Come  (CD)
1997   The Scarlet Flower, Part I of the Royal Album  (CD)
2000    Clown King, II part of the Royal Album (CD)
2004  My Fate is in Your Hands...  (CD)
2007    Names for All Time. Igor Nadzhiev  (CD)
2010   I Love You!  (CD)
2011    Thank You...  (MP3)
2012    If Only You Were with Me...  (CD)
2014  Igor Nadzhiev. 20 years Later (DVD)
2016  In the Russian Heart...  (DVD)
2018   God, Save Russia!  (CD)

Selected filmography
 White Nights (1992; dir. Leonid Kvinikhidze)
 Baby by November (1992; dir. Aleksandr Pavlovskiy)
 Musketeers Twenty Years After (1992; dir.  Georgi Yungvald-Khilkevich)
 The Secret of Queen Anne or Musketeers Thirty Years After (1993; dir.  Georgi Yungvald-Khilkevich)
 Russian Amazons (2002; dir.  Isaac Friedberg)

Personal life
Wife Alla Nadzhieva-Vorontsova. Has a daughter Olga and a son Igor.

According to the singer himself, he performed seven operations on his nose, the cause of which was an injury received by Nadzhiev at school age.

References

External links
 Official site 
 

1967 births
Living people
People from  Astrakhan
Russian pop singers
Soviet pop singers
Russian composers
Russian male composers
Soviet male singers
Russian male singer-songwriters
Russian people of Iranian  descent